Eupithecia selva is a moth in the family Geometridae. It is found in Chile and/or Peru.

References

Moths described in 1992
selva
Moths of South America